Andrey Deyev (born 20 January 1978) is a Russian fencer. He competed in the individual and team foil events at the 2000 Summer Olympics.

References

External links
 

1978 births
Living people
Russian male foil fencers
Olympic fencers of Russia
Fencers at the 2000 Summer Olympics
Sportspeople from Yekaterinburg